The 2018–19 Ethiopian Premier League is the 72nd season of top-tier football in Ethiopia (21st season as the Premier League). The season started on 27 October 2018.

League table

Map

References

Premier League
Ethiopia
Ethiopian Premier League